Daniela Masseroni (born 28 February 1985 in Trescore Balneario) is a former Italian rhythmic gymnast.

Biography
She won the silver medal in the competition of rhythmic gymnastics group at Athens Olympics in 2004. She finished 4th in the same event at the 2008 Summer Olympics. She won also 14 medals at the World Championships (four gold), and 11 at the European Championships (one gold at Turin 2008).

Olympic results

Honours
 Officer: Ufficiale Ordine al Merito della Repubblica Italiana: 27 September 2004

See also
Italy at the 2004 Summer Olympics - Medalists

References

External links
 
 
 
 

Living people
1985 births
Olympic gymnasts of Italy
Olympic medalists in gymnastics
Olympic silver medalists for Italy
Italian rhythmic gymnasts
Gymnasts at the 2004 Summer Olympics
Gymnasts at the 2008 Summer Olympics
Medalists at the 2004 Summer Olympics
Competitors at the 2001 World Games
Medalists at the Rhythmic Gymnastics World Championships
Medalists at the Rhythmic Gymnastics European Championships
People from Trescore Balneario
Sportspeople from the Province of Bergamo
21st-century Italian women